The  mile was a track cycling event held as part of the Cycling at the 1904 Summer Olympics programme.  It was the only time this  event was held at the Olympics.  10 American cyclists competed.  The names of 4 of the competitors are not known.

Results

Heats

The top two finishers in each heat advanced to the semifinals.  The identities of the 6 cyclists competing in the third and fourth heats are unknown, though Marcus Hurley and Burton Downing were among the 4 who advanced to the semifinals.  The 2 eliminated cyclists are unknown, as are the 2 who moved on along with Hurley and Downing.

Semifinals

The top two finishers in each semifinal advanced to the final.  Hurley and Downing were the two winners in the second semifinal; the two other cyclists who had advanced from heats 3 and 4 took third and fourth place in that semifinal but their names are unknown.

Final

References

Sources

 

Cycling at the 1904 Summer Olympics
Track cycling at the 1904 Summer Olympics
Olympic track cycling events